Muta may refer to:

Acronyms 
 MUTA, an acronym for the Mechanics' Union of Trade Associations
 MUTA, an acronym for Male Urogenital Teaching Associate, in medical education
 MUTA, an abbreviation in the United States Army Reserve for a "Multiple Unit Training Assembly" (multiple refers not to multiple units but the multiple pay periods (usually four) for which reserve component soldiers receive credit for attending Battle Assembly)
 MUTA, an abbreviation for Murray Bridge Training Area in South Australia, used by the Australian Army

Places 
 Municipality of Muta, in Slovenia
 Muta, Muta, a settlement in Slovenia
 Mu'tah, a town in Jordan and site of the 7th-century Battle of Mu'tah
 Pagoda of Fogong Temple, known as Muta, a wooden pagoda in Shanxi Province, China

People 
 Muta (surname) (including a list of people with the name)
 Muta of Daylam (died 640s), an Iranian king
 Keiji Mutoh (born 1962), Japanese wrestler known as The Great Muta
 Miroslav Nikolić (born 1956), Serbian professional basketball coach
 Twitch streamer known as itsMuta

Other uses 
 Muta (deity), the personification of silence in Roman mythology
 Muta,  the short-name of the unit type Mutalisk from the video game StarCraft
 Nikah mut'ah, a temporary marriage in Islam
 Mut'ah of Hajj, relaxation between the lesser and greater Hajj
 Muta, a character in The Cat Returns
 Muta, a 1930s slang term for marijuana
 Muta, an informal unit for measuring blood loss in wrestling